Anoctus is a genus of Scarabaeidae; a scarab beetle in the superfamily Scarabaeoidea.

References

Scarabaeidae